The Canadian Coast Guard has had two motor lifeboats named CCGS Clarks Harbour.
The first was a  vessel, which entered service in 1996.

The second is a Canadian Coast Guard Arun-class lifeboat, based on the United Kingdom   motor lifeboat design.
She is staffed by a crew of four.

See also

Clarks Harbour is one of ten Arun-class lifeboats operated by the Canadian Coast Guard:
  - one of two lifeboat operating out of Sambro, Nova Scotia.
  - same class of boat operating out of Westport, Nova Scotia.

References

Arun-class lifeboats of the Canadian Coast Guard
1996 ships
Ships built in Ontario
Ships of the Canadian Coast Guard